National Party (Ireland) may refer to:

National Party (Ireland, 1924), defunct political party, active from 1924 to 1925
National Party (Ireland, 2016), political party founded in 2016
Catholic Democrats (Ireland), political party founded in 1995, formerly known as the National Party

See also
Nationalist Party (Ireland)
National Centre Party (Ireland)
National Corporate Party
National Democratic Party (Ireland)
National Labour Party (Ireland)
National League Party